The Protestant Kaiser Wilhelm Memorial Cemetery  is a burial ground in the Westend district of Berlin with a size of 3.7 hectares. The cemetery is under monument and cultural heritage protection.

The cemetery is located on Fürstenbrunner way, adjacent to the cemetery Luisenfriedhof III  and is connected by two paths.

History
The Protestant Kaiser Wilhelm Memorial Church was established in 1896 due to the growing Lutheran population in West Berlin. Luisen parish gave the congregation of the Kaiser Wilhelm Memorial Church a  site for the founding of its own cemetery.

The inauguration of the cemetery with the first burial took place on 25 July 1896.

In 1903 a cemetery chapel was built. Until then they used the facilities at the adjacent cemetery, Luisenfriedhof III. The chapel was designed in Romanesque style and the dedication of the chapel took place on 27 September 1903.

Unique among the chapels in Berlin cemeteries, was a burial vault system.
In World War II the chapel was badly damaged. The chapel was rebuilt in 1952/1953 and 1978 with extensive renovations.

Notable burials
Notables buried include:
 Franz Betz (1835–1900), Bass-baritone opera singer, who sang at the Berlin State Opera from 1859 to 1897
 Alfred Dührssen (1862–1933), Gynecologist and obstetrician
 Woldemar Friedrich (1846–1910), Historical painter and illustrator
 Richard von Kaufmann (1849–1908), Minister of finance and art collector
 Otto von Gierke (1841–1921), Historian
 Alfred Goldscheider (1858–1935), Neurologist
 Otto Hirschfeld (1843–1922), Epigraphist and professor of ancient history
 Joseph Joachim (1831–1907), Hungarian violinist, conductor, composer and teacher
 Fedor Krause (1857–1937), Neurosurgeon
 Oskar Liebreich (1839–1908), Pharmacologist
 John Henry Mackay (1864–1933)
 Alexander Merensky (1837–1918), Protestant missionary
 Henny Porten (1890–1960), Actress and film producer of the silent era
 John Rabe (1882–1950), Businessmen, helped to establish the Nanking Safety Zone
 Heinrich Reimann (1850–1906), Musicologist, organist, and composer
 Friedrich Spielhagen (1829–1911), Novelist

Gallery

References

 Friedhof der Ev. Kaiser-Wilhelm-Gedächtnis-Kirche im Lexikon des Bezirks Charlottenburg-Wilmersdorf

Cemeteries in Berlin
Charlottenburg-Wilmersdorf
Lutheran cemeteries in Germany